The cheetah or cheeta are a gotra in Meena community found in the state of Rajasthan in India.

References

Also see 
Marmat

Social groups of Rajasthan

Meena people